Crossocheilus cobitis is a species of ray-finned fish in the genus Crossocheilus. It is native to the Mekong basin and Indonesia and Malaysia.

References

Crossocheilus
Fish described in 1854